The second season of Hart of Dixie an American television series, originally aired in the United States on The CW from October 2, 2012 through May 7, 2013, with a total of 22 episodes. The season is produced by CBS Television Studios. Hart of Dixie was renewed for a third season on April 26, 2013.

Overview
The season begins with Zoe confused with her feelings for both George and Wade. She later decides that George isn't ready for another relationship and decides to see Wade. Levon's former high school sweetheart Ruby Jeffries played by Golden Brooks returns to Bluebell and reveals she is opposing for mayor. George begins dating again, first seeing newcomer Shelby (Laura Bell Bundy) however he later dumps her and Shelby begins dating Brick Breeland, and George later starts a relationship with Wade's ex-wife Tansy Truitt (Mircea Monroe) As the season progresses, Ruby leaves after Lemon's jealousy destroys her and Levon. Wade and Zoe continue to date, however face set backs time and time again. Annabeth begins having feelings for Levon and later the two sleep together, leaving Lemon devastated by her best friend's betrayal.

Cast and characters

Regular
 Rachel Bilson as Dr. Zoe Hart
 Scott Porter as George Tucker
 Jaime King as Lemon Breeland
 Cress Williams as Lavon Hayes
 Wilson Bethel as  Wade Kinsella
 Tim Matheson as Dr. Brick Breeland

Recurring Characters
 Kaitlyn Black as Annabeth Nass
 Reginald VelJohnson as Dash DeWitt
 Brandi Burkhardt as Crickett Watts
 McKaley Miller as Rose Hattenbarger
 Claudia Lee as Magnolia Breeland
 Golden Brooks as Ruby Jeffries
 Mircea Monroe as Tansy Truitt
 Laura Bell Bundy as Shelby Sinclair
 Travis Van Winkle as Jonah Breeland
 Armelia McQueen as Shula Whitaker
 JoBeth Williams as Candice Hart
 John Marshall Jones as Wally Maynard
 Amy Ferguson as Lily Anne Lonergan
 Charlie Robinson as Sergeant Jeffries
 Ross Philips as Tom Long
 Mallory Moye as Wanda Lewis
 Matt Lowe as Meatball
 Steven M. Porter as Frank Moth
 Peter Mackenzie as Reverend Peter Mayfair
 Christopher Curry as Earl Kinsella
 John Eric Bentley as Sheriff Bill
 Alan Autry as Todd Gainey
 Joe Massingill as Cody
 Dawn Didawick as Eugenia
 Kim Robillard as Sal
 Esther Scott as Delma Warner
 Mary Page Keller as Emily Chase
 Carla Renata as Susie
 Ilene Graff as Clora Tucker
 Kelen Coleman as Presley
 Megan Ferguson as Daisy
 Lindsey Van Horn as Amy-Rose
 Bayne Gibby as Shanetta
 McKayla Maroney as Tonya
 Matt Hobby as Rudy Pruitt
 Bill Parks as Chicken Truitt
 Kevin Sheridan as Rockett Truitt
 Eric Pierpoint as Harold Tucker

Special Guest Star
 Robert Buckley as Peter
 Debra Jo Rupp as Wanda Lewis's mother

Episodes

Casting
Season two saw the return of several characters from season one and also introduced new characters. Mircea Monroe returned as Tansy Truitt, who begins a relationship with George Tucker. Kaitlyn Black's character Annabeth Nass, become a more prominent character in the second season. Laura Bell Bundy was introduced in the first episode as Shelby a love interest for George Tucker, however, later beings a relationship Brick. Golden Brooks was cast as Ruby Jeffries and was announced on August 8, 2012 Ruby arrives as an old rival of Lemon and an old flame of Levon. Travis Van Winkle was cast as the Breeland cousin, Jonah, who becomes a love interest for Zoe. Eisa Davis who played Addie Pickett in season one did not return for season two as did Deborah S. Craig who played Shelley Ng.

Reception
The season premiered to 1.53 million people with a 0.7 rating share for adults 18-49.

Home release
Hart of Dixie: The Complete Second Season was released on DVD in the U.S. on October 15, 2013. The 5 disc set includes all 22 episodes from the second season and various language and subtitle options.

References

2012 American television seasons
2013 American television seasons